is a Japanese skeleton racer. He competed in the 2018 Winter Olympics.

References

1995 births
Living people
Skeleton racers at the 2018 Winter Olympics
Japanese male skeleton racers
Olympic skeleton racers of Japan